Elán is a Slovak pop rock band founded in 1968 by elementary school classmates Jožo Ráž, Vašo Patejdl, Juraj Farkaš, and Zdeno Baláž. They became one of the most popular Czechoslovak bands during the 1980s, releasing ten successful albums between 1981 and 1991. In 1993, the group represented Slovakia in the preliminary round of the Eurovision Song Contest but having finished in fourth place, failed to qualify for the finals in Ireland. Elán performed at the FIS Nordic World Ski Championships 2009 in Liberec, Czech Republic, as part of the championship's entertainment festivities.
The band has toured internationally throughout their career. They have produced many well-known hits and won several awards, such as the Slávik Awards, Slávik, and Zlatý slavík, which they won four years in a row.

History
Elán began by playing in high-school and university clubs in Bratislava, and later got the opportunity to play overseas, in such places as Tunisia, Bulgaria, and Sweden. Their first original compositions were the songs "Dám ti všetko čo mám" (I'll Give You Everything I Have), "Semafór" (Semaphore), and "Bláznivé hry" (Crazy Games), with which the band performed at the Bratislavská lyra festival in 1979, and which won Patejdl the award for best arrangement.

The group became known to the general public in 1980 after winning the silver prize with the song "Kaskadér" (Stuntman) at Bratislavská lyra. During the 1980s, Elán gained in popularity with their original Slovak songs. A significant change in the band's direction was the arrival of Ján Baláž, previously with Modus, in 1981. Their debut album, Ôsmy svetadiel (Eighth Continent), was released the same year. It was followed by Nie sme zlí (We Aren't Mean) in 1982, Elán 3 in 1983, and Hodina slovenčiny (Slovak Hour) in 1985.

In the second half of the 1980s, Zdeno Baláž, Vašo Patejdl, and Juraj Farkaš left the group. Ján Baláž, together with Jožo Ráž, completed the group's lineup with drummer Gabriel Szab and keyboardist Martin Karvaš. The personnel change also heralded a new phase in the band's career. They released the album Detektívka (Detective Story) in 1986, followed by Nebezpečný náklad (Dangerous Goods) in 1988 and Rabaka in 1989. Rabaka was accompanied by an eponymous film, which included production work by Boris Filan and Dušan Rapoš. At the end of 1989, Martin Karvaš and Gabo Szabó left the group.

At the start of the 1990s, the group's lineup consisted of Jožo Ráž, Ján Baláž, Peter Farnbauer, Ľubomír Horňák, and Juraj Kuchárek. They recorded the album Netvor z čiernej hviezdy Q7A (Creature from Black Hole Q7A) and released it in 1991. The following year, the band issued a greatest hits compilation titled Legendy 1 (Legends 1). The album Hodina angličtiny (English Hour) came out in 1994. In 1996, Patejdl returned to Elán and the band announced the recording of a new album, which was released under the title Hodina pravdy (The Hour of Truth) in 1997. Two more commercially successful albums were subsequently released, Elán 3000 (2002) and Tretie oko (Third Eye) (2003).
Elán went on an extended hiatus in the mid-2000s, returning in 2010 with the album Anjelska daň (Angel Tax). In 2014, they signed a record deal with Warner Music and released the album Živých nás nedostanú (They Won't Take Us Alive).
The band's fifteenth album, and to date latest, was released in 2019, and titled Najvyšší čas (About Time).

Band members

Current members
 Jožo Ráž – lead vocals, bass (1968–present)
 Jano Baláž – guitars, lead vocals (1981–present)
 Vašo Patejdl – guitars (1968–1969), keyboards (1969–1985, 1996–present), lead vocals (1968–1985, 1996–present)
 Peter Farnbauer – guitars, keyboards, saxophone, vocals (1990–present)
 Ľubo Horňák – keyboards, vocals (1991–present)
 Štefan Bugala – drums (2016–present)

Horn section
 Richard Šimurka – saxophone, flute (2014–present)
 Martin Haas – trombone (2014–present)
 Samuel Šimek – trumpet (2014–present)

Past members
 Juraj Farkaš – guitars, vocals (1968–1985), lead vocals on "Belasý let" (1981)
 Zdeno Baláž – drums (1968–1985)
 Juraj Fábry – keyboards, vocals (1968–1969)
 Pavol Šikula – saxophone, clarinet (1972–1974)
 Štefan Horný – trumpet (1972–1973)
 Hana Horská – percussion, lead vocals (1972)
 Peter Kollárik – trumpet (1973–1975)
 František Poul – trombone, flute (1973–1974)
 Boris Kopčák – trombone, vocals, violin (1974–1978)
 Fero Turák – trumpet, vocals, violin (1975–1978)
 Jozef Tekel – saxophone, flute, vocals, violin (1975–1979)
 Júlia Feketeová – percussion, flute, vocals (1975)
 Dalibor Moyzes – percussion (1977–1979)
 Peter Šišma – trumpet (1977–1978)
 Marián Broušek – trombone (1977–1978)
 Milan Jendruch – saxophone, clarinet, percussion (1977–1979)
 Pavol Duga – trumpet (1977–1978)
 Martin Karvaš – keyboards, vocals (1985–1989)
 Gabo Szabó – drums (1985–1989)
 Vladimír Jánoš – guitar (1990–1991)
 Juraj Kuchárek – drums (1991–2002, 2004-2007)
 Henry Tóth – guitars (2003-2014)
 Marcel Buntaj – drums (2003)
 Boris Brna – drums (2008-2016)

Guest studio musicians
 Piešťanská folková skupina Slniečko – vocals on "Mláďatá" and "Belasý let" (1981)
 Viera Briestenská – vocals on "Nie sme zlí" (1982)
 Ladislav Briestenský – vocals on "Nie sme zlí" (1982)
 Ľuboš Stankovský – drums (1985)
 Vašo Patejdl – synths, vocals (1986)
 Štefan Nosáľ – fujara, vocals on "Tanečnice z Lúčnice" (1986)
 Anton Jaro – fretless guitar on "Neobzerajte sa pani Lótová" (1986), bass (1988, 1989)
 J. Ťapák – vocals on "Tanečnice z Lúčnice" (1986)
 P. Holík – vocals on "Tanečnice z Lúčnice" (1986)
 M. Hesek – vocals on "Tanečnice z Lúčnice" (1986)
 Dušan Huščava – tenor saxophone (1986, 1988)
 J. Fabrický – drums (1988)
 Marián Kochanský – vocals (1988)
 Eva Balážová – cimbalom on "Od Tatier k Dunaju" (1989)
 Roman Grešák – vocals on "Hostia z inej planéty" (1991)
 Jaroslav Dudík – violin on "Hostia z inej planéty" (1991)
 Peter Abrahám – violin, strings (1997)
 Pavol Jursa – vocals (1997, 2019)
 Juraj Burian – acoustic guitar on "O láske" (2002)
 Erik Boboš Procházka – harmonica on "Nežný a plný energie" (2010)
 Lenka Lo Hrůzová – lead vocals on "Neodchádzaj" (2014)
 András Madarász – harmonica on "Sto životov" (2019)

Guest live musicians
 Fero Turák – keyboards, vocals (1978-1980, 1990–1991)
 Viktor Hidvéghy – bass (1990–1991, 1998), organ (1998)
 Július Petrus – drums (1990–1991)
 Fero Oláh – keyboards, vocals (1990–1991)
 Juraj Farkaš – solo guitar (1996)
 Zdeno Baláž – drums (1996)
 Juraj Burian – acoustic guitar, vocals (1998)
 Tony Benedek – percussion (1998, 2004-2005)
 Ľuboš Stankovský – drums (2001)
 Gapeel's vocal group – vocals (2003)
 G-Strinx – violins (2007-2008)
 Lenka Lo Hrůzová – vocals (2014)
 Nina Kraljić – vocals (2016)
 Kristína Mihaľová – vocals (2018-2019)
 Laura Wengová – vocals (2018-2019)
 Zuzana Ďurdinová – vocals (2018-2019)
 Marián Svetlík – violin (2018-2019)
 Juraj Madari – viola (2018-2019)
 Petra Pálková – violin (2018-2019)
 Júlia Mušáková – violin (2018-2019)

Timeline

Discography
Studio albums
 1981 - Ôsmy svetadiel
 1982 - Nie Sme zlí
 1983 - Elán 3
 1985 - Hodina slovenčiny
 1986 - Detektívka
 1988 - Nebezpečný náklad
 1989 - Rabaka
 1991 - Netvor z čiernej hviezdy Q7A
 1994 - Hodina angličtiny
 1997 - Hodina pravdy
 2002 - Elán 3000
 2003 - Tretie oko
 2010 - Anjelska daň
 2014 - Živých nás nedostanú
 2019 - Najvyšší čas

English studio albums
 1982 - Kamikadze Lover
 1984 - Nightshift
 1985 - Schoolparty
 1987 - Missing
 1989 - Midnight in the City

Live albums
 1998 - Elán Unplugged (2 CD)
 2004 - Elán: Megakoncert
 2005 - Elán na Hrade
 2007 - Elán Unplugged, Carnegie Hall, New York
 2013 - Elán v divadle
 2016 - Elán Live (Best of Vol.2)

Compilations
 1987 - Neviem byť sám
 1992 - Legenda 1
 1992 - Legenda 2
 1995 - Hodina nehy
 1997 - Classic
 1997 - Legenda 3
 1998 - Legenda 4
 1999 - Jožo... (2 CD)
 2000 - Láska je stvorená
 2000 - Legenda 5 - Posledná...
 2001 - Neviem byť sám 2001: roky a rock
 2001 - Otázniky/Všetko čo máš
 2009 - Hodina Rocku
 2015 - Kamaráti
 2019 - Zlodej slnečníc

See also
 The 100 Greatest Slovak Albums of All Time

References

External links

 

Slovak rock music groups
Slovak pop rock music groups
Eurovision Song Contest entrants of 1993
Eurovision Song Contest entrants for Slovakia
Zlatý slavík winners